The 73rd Road is one of the most major roads of Mandalay. It joined from south to north. It started from the junction with Mandalay–Mogok Highway Road near the North of Mandalay Hill and ends in Manawhari Road. It across the Mandalay University as Adipadi Road. Its major junctions are junctions with 26th (B) Road, 30th Road, 35th Road, Theikpan Road, Manawhari Road. Now, the road is constructing to the junction with National Highway 1.

Remark places
Mingalar Market
University of Medicine, Mandalay
Mandalay University
Mandalarthiri Stadium
Myanmar Institute of Information Technology
University of Traditional Medicine
Shwe Man Taung Stadium

Major junctions 
Mandalay–Mogok Highway Road
26th (B) Road
30th Road
Theikpan Road

References

Mandalay
Roads in Myanmar